Paul Israel Rapoport (March 6, 1940, Flushing, New York – July 9, 1987, New York, New York) was a co-founder of both the New York City Lesbian, Gay, Bisexual and Transgender Community Services Center and Gay Men's Health Crisis. The private foundation that bore his name was, during its active years, one of the oldest and largest LGBT-focused foundations in the country.

Son of Ida and David and younger brother of Daniel, Paul Rapoport attended New York City P.S. 107, the Horace Mann School and Cornell University, from which he graduated in 1962. He graduated cum laude from Columbia University Law School in 1965, and later received an LL.M. in tax from New York University School of Law.

Rapoport died of AIDS at New York University Medical Center at the age of 47. In September 1987 his estate of roughly $8 million was used to establish The Paul Rapoport Foundation, which at Rapoport's direction gave to LGBT and HIV/AIDS causes in the New York metropolitan area.

In a press release dated July 6, 2009 the Paul Rapoport Foundation announced its intention to spend out. The Foundation ceased operations in June 2015. Its archives are located in the Human Sexuality Collection of the Cornell University Library.

References

Sources 
Obituary, The Record (Bergen County), July 12, 1987

People from Queens, New York
1940 births
1987 deaths
New York (state) lawyers
Horace Mann School alumni
New York University School of Law alumni
Columbia Law School alumni
Cornell University alumni
AIDS-related deaths in New York (state)
20th-century American lawyers